"What Ya Want" (also titled "What Y'all Want") is a song by American rapper Eve. It features American singer Nokio of Dru Hill and appears on the compilation album Ryde or Die Vol. 1 (1999) by American record label Ruff Ryders Entertainment. A remix of the song appears as a bonus track on Eve's debut studio album Let There Be Eve...Ruff Ryders' First Lady (1999).

Composition
"What Ya Want" is a hip hop song containing Latin-inspired elements. In a Pitchfork review, Rawiya Kameir described the song as "built around a rudimentary Latin preset on an E-MU synth".

Charts

References

1999 singles
Eve (rapper) songs
Song recordings produced by Swizz Beatz
Songs written by Swizz Beatz
Ruff Ryders Entertainment singles
Interscope Records singles
1999 songs
Songs written by Eve (rapper)

pl:What Ya Want